The Regional Museum of Natural History at Mysore, is a museum in India with exhibits on plants, animals and geology of the southern region of India.

Description 
The Regional Museum of Natural History at Mysore, was inaugurated on 20 May 1995. It was undertaken by the government of India, ministry of environment and forests. The museum is located on the banks of Karanji Lake, with the Chamundi Hills visible in the background. It is now a landmark in the city. The museum exhibits plants, animals and geology of the southern region of India.  The galleries emphasize the conservation of nature and natural resources while depicting ecological interrelationship among plants and animals. Visually challenged students can feel the exhibits of animals on the premises. The museum provides an extracurricular activity for schools and promotes environmental awareness.

Galleries 
 Biological Diversity has multiple sections. The first section has a special emphasis on the western ghats. It exhibits the biodiversity of the southern region of India. The next section is about tropical rain forests, of countries that possess them, showcasing their diversity and global benefits. The next section is on the significance of wetlands and the mangrove forests. The next section depicts a diorama of a marine habitat. The last section has a large exhibit panel cautioning against the destruction natural diversity.
 Life through the Ages is walk-through tunnel, depicting evolution of life.
 The Discovery center consists of a discovery room, a computer room, a vivarium and a mini weather station. Children can handle, examine and study specimens in the discovery room. A mini theater, a sound booth are also present to keep children occupied. The bioscience computer room facilitates studying biology through interactive and multimedia techniques at a high-school or college level.

Botanical garden 
On the grounds of the museum is a small botanical garden with local trees and a collection of plants used in Ayurvedic medicine.

The gardens include an interpretative trail section designed for the visually impaired with not only signs in brail but also a sunken foot bridge to provide a "walk in water" experience of aquatic plants and fishes. Museum curators describe this section as "the first museum garden for the visually impaired in India."

See also 
 National Museum of Natural History, New Delhi
 Regional Museum of Natural History, Bhopal
 Regional Museum of Natural History, Bhubaneswar
 Rajiv Gandhi Regional Museum of Natural History, Sawai Madhopur

External links 
Homepage of Regional Museum of Natural History, Mysore

Museums in Mysore
Natural history museums in India
1995 establishments in Karnataka
Museums established in 1995